The US-China University Presidents Roundtable is a biennial international conference gathering of the presidents and chancellors from leading U.S. and Chinese universities. It is also a major event of the China-US Strategic Economic Dialogue.

The purpose of the conference is to discuss global education, research collaboration and cultural exchanges between the U.S. and Chinese institutions.

Roundtable 2013
The first Presidents Roundtable was held at the University of Chicago on November 18, 2013.

Participant

United States
 University of Chicago 
 Rice University 
 California Institute of Technology 
 University of Washington 
 Washington University in St. Louis
 New York University 
 Texas A&M University  
 Duke University 
 University of Notre Dame 
 Colby College
 Fermi National Accelerator Laboratory

China

 Peking University
 East China Normal University
 Fudan University
 Shanghai Jiao Tong University
 Zhejiang University
 Wuhan University
 Sun Yat-sen University
 Chongqing University
 Sichuan University
 Xi'an Jiaotong University
 Jilin University

Roundtable 2015
In 2015 the Roundtable will be hosted at Rice University.

References

Biennial events
Recurring events established in 2013